Speke's gazelle (Gazella spekei) is the smallest of the gazelle species. It is confined to the Horn of Africa, where it inhabits stony brush, grass steppes, and semi deserts. This species has been sometimes regarded as a subspecies of the Dorcas gazelle, though this is now widely disregarded. Severe habitat fragmentation means it is now impossible to assess the natural migratory or nomadic patterns of G. spekei. Its numbers are under threat, and despite an increase in population, the IUCN in 2007 announced its status had changed from vulnerable to endangered. A captive population is maintained, and the wild population exists in the lower tens of thousands. As of 2008, this gazelle is classified as endangered under the IUCN Red List.

Speke's gazelle is named after John Hanning Speke, a British explorer of Central Africa.

References

External links
Speke's gazelle facts

External links 

Photos of Speke's gazelle at Al Wabra Wildlife Preserve

Speke's gazelle
Mammals of Somalia
Fauna of the Horn of Africa
Speke's gazelle
Speke's gazelle